The Normanhurst School was an independent, non-denominational , day and boarding school for girls that operated in Ashfield, in the Inner Western suburbs of Sydney, New South Wales, Australia.

Despite being non-denominational, the Normanhurst school maintained close links with St John's Anglican Parish, which was situated in the vicinity of the school.

History 

The Normanhurst School was established in 1882 by Ellen Clarke, who was an English national. Clarke was principal of the school from its founding in 1882 to 1893.

At its foundation, the school operated out of a cottage located on Bland Street, Ashfield. Later as the school expanded, it moved to another larger campus in Ashfield at the intersection of Orpington and Chandos streets (pictured right).

Through the initiative of the then headmistress, Evelyn Tildesley, the Normanhurst School became a founding member of the Headmistresses’ Association of NSW (which has since become the Association of Heads of Independent Girls' Schools) in 1916.

The school ceased operations in 1941.

Notable alumnae 
 Daphne Akhurst (1903–1933) – five times Australian Open tennis champion
 Janet Cosh (1901–1989) – amateur botanist and plant collector
 Margaret Slattery  (1922–2015) – National Secretary of the Australian Parents Council during the 1970s, an advocacy organisation for non-government schools 
 P. L. Travers   (1899–1996) – author of the Mary Poppins series of children's books, later adapted into the musical film of the same name

References

1882 establishments in Australia
1941 disestablishments in Australia
Defunct girls' schools in Australia
Defunct schools in Sydney
Defunct schools in New South Wales
Former boarding schools in New South Wales
Association of Heads of Independent Girls' Schools